The Reading is an oil painting by French painter Édouard Manet, circa 1865 - 1873.

History
The painting was first exhibited in 1880 in one of the regular solo exhibitions mounted by Manet in his workshop. The picture was also part of the great posthumous exhibition of Manet's work in 1884, a year after his death.

The work first belonged to the private collection of Winnaretta Singer, Princess Edmond de Polignac, where it remained until 1944, after the death of the Princess. It was offered as a gift to the French State and deposited in the Musée du Louvre. In 1947, it was transferred to the Galerie nationale du Jeu de Paume, a showroom located in the Jardin des Tuileries and which  belongs to the Louvre. It remained there until 1986, when, with the creation of the Musée d'Orsay, it was brought to this museum, like the rest of the collection of Impressionist paintings in the Louvre. It can currently be seen in the Musée d'Orsay, in room 31 of level 5.

Analysis
The painting depicts the artist's wife, Suzanne Manet (born Suzanne Leenhoff), seated, and their son, Leon, standing and reading a book. Leon was a recurrent model for Manet who portrayed him in several pictures, such as The Lunch, The Boy Carrying a Sword and The Bubbles of Soap.

In this work the white woman's dress dominates, and the sofa and curtains are treated with broad strokes of high brightness, in counterpoint to the dark tone of the belt and collar. According to Peter H. Feist, in this painting "Manet reacts more sensitive than usual, and looks especially to shades of white that are offered to his eyes".

References

Paintings by Édouard Manet
Paintings in the collection of the Musée d'Orsay
1860s paintings
Books in art